The IFFHS World Team is a football award given annually since 2017. The award is given by the International Federation of Football History & Statistics (IFFHS).

Men's winners

List of winners 

In 2017, IFFHS started to nominate a world team of the year.

Statistics

All-time Men's Dream Team (2021)

Men Team of the Century (1901–2000)

Men Team of the Decade (2011–2020)

Women's winners

List of winners 

In 2017, IFFHS started to nominate a world team of the year.

Statistics

All-time Women's Dream Team (2021)

Women Team of the Century (1901–2000)

Women Team of the Decade (2011–2020)

See also 
International Federation of Football History & Statistics
IFFHS World's Best Club
IFFHS World's Best Player
IFFHS World's Best Goalkeeper
IFFHS World's Best Top Goal Scorer
IFFHS World's Best International Goal Scorer
IFFHS World's Best Club Coach
IFFHS World's Best National Coach

References 

International Federation of Football History & Statistics
Association football trophies and awards